Donald Rumbelow (born 1940) is a British former City of London Police officer, crime historian, and ex-curator of the City of London Police's Crime Museum. He has twice been chairman of England's Crime Writers' Association.

Career
A recognised authority on the Whitechapel Murders, he currently acts as a London Tourist Board Blue Badged guide of the Jack the Ripper Walk, a walking tour in London visiting the locations associated with the crimes. He has appeared in several television documentaries examining the subject. In 2021, he contributed regularly to Railway Murders.

His literary and lecturing work ranges over several centuries of London's crime history.

Personal life
Rumbelow is married and has two children.

Books by Donald Rumbelow
 Donald Rumbelow: I Spy Blue: Police and Crime in the City of London from Elizabeth I to Victoria, Macmillan, 1971
 Donald Rumbelow: Houndsditch Murders, Macmillan, 1973
 Donald Rumbelow: The Complete Jack the Ripper, London: W.H. Allen, 1975 (reprinted as Jack the Ripper: The Complete Casebook).
 The Complete Jack the Ripper, fully revised and updated. 2004.
 Donald Rumbelow and Judy Hindley, illustrated by Colin King: Know How Book of Detection, Usborne Publishing Ltd, 1978
 Donald Rumbelow: Triple Tree, Harap, 1982
 Stewart P. Evans and Donald Rumbelow: Jack the Ripper: Scotland Yard Investigates, Sutton Publishing, 2007,

External links 
 www.walks.com - Homepage of the 'Jack the Ripper' walks

References

British historians
Living people
1940 births